"Bitter Pill" is a song by Siobhan Fahey, originally released in October 2002 with the label God Made Me Hardcore. The single performed moderately, peaking at number 108 on the UK Singles Chart. A heavily remixed, more rock-oriented version later appeared on Fahey's project Shakespears Sister's fourth studio album, Songs from the Red Room.

Track listing 
CD single
"Bitter Pill" (Radio Edit) — 3:36
"Bitter Pill" (Droyds Mix) — 6:27
"Bitter Pill" (Bitter Dub) — 6:26

Charts

References 

2002 singles
British pop songs
Shakespears Sister songs
Songs written by Siobhan Fahey